Happy Anderson (born November 19, 1976) is an American actor who has worked in film, television, on and off Broadway. He is best known for his roles as Mr. James "Jimmy" Fester on Cinemax's The Knick and Jerry Brudos on the Netflix series Mindhunter, from executive producer/director David Fincher. Anderson appears in the Netflix films Bird Box as River Man and Bright as Montehugh, a human who works for the FBI's magic division.

Biography
Anderson was born in High Falls, New York. He graduated from Rondout Valley High School in 1995. He received a bachelor of fine arts degree from Ithaca College in 1999, graduating alongside Larry Teng, Kevin Deiboldt, Ben Wilson and Brantley Aufill. He graduated with a master's of fine arts from Indiana University Bloomington in 2002. In 2003, he moved to New York City.

Filmography

Film

Television

Video games

Theater
 1999–2000: Creede Repertory Theatre
 2003: Kentucky Shakespeare Festival
 2004: Pennsylvania Shakespeare Festival
 2006: Texas Shakespeare Festival
 2008: Emancipation, Classical Theatre of Harlem
 2010: The Merchant of Venice and A Winter's Tale, Shakespeare in the Park
 2011: The Merchant of Venice, Broadway (dir. Daniel J. Sullivan)
 2012: Richard III/As You Like It/Inherit The Wind, Old Globe Theatre
 2013: The Twenty-Seventh Man, The Public Theatre
 2014: As You Like It, Shakespeare Theatre Company

References

External links
Official website

1976 births
Living people
Ithaca College alumni
People from New Paltz, New York
Indiana University Bloomington alumni
American male actors